Barnoldswick Town Football Club is a football club based in Barnoldswick, Lancashire, England. They are affiliated to the West Riding County Football Association.

History
The original Barnoldswick Town joined the Lancashire Combination in 1924. After finishing bottom of the league in 1932–33 and 1933–34, they left the league. They joined the Yorkshire League in 1935, but left after a single season, and subsequently folded.

The modern club was established in 1972 as Barnoldswick United (1972), and joined the Craven & District League, where they played until joining the East Lancashire League in the beginning of the 1990s. In 1997, they switched to Division Two of the West Lancashire League. After finishing as runners up in their first season, they were promoted to Division One.

The following season saw them win Division One, earning promotion to the Premier Division. In 2003, the club absorbed Barnoldswick Park Rovers and Salterforth Juniors, and was renamed Barnoldswick Town. A sixth place finish in the 2008–09 season was enough to see them promoted to Division One of the North West Counties League. They earned back-to-back promotions after finishing as runners up in Division One in the 2009–10 season, and were promoted to the Premier Division.

Honours
West Lancashire League
Division One champions 1998–99
Craven Cup
Winners 1987–88, 1993–94, 1997–98, 2010–11
Morrison Cup
Winners 1985–86, 1994–95, 1996–97

Records
Best FA Cup performance: First qualifying round, 2017–18
Best FA Vase performance: Third round, 2012–13
Record attendance: 691 vs Macclesfield, North West Counties League Premier Division, 28 August 2021

See also
Barnoldswick Town F.C. players

References

External links

Football clubs in England
Football clubs in Lancashire
Association football clubs established in 1972
1972 establishments in England
Barnoldswick
Sport in the Borough of Pendle
Lancashire Combination
Yorkshire Football League
Craven and District Football League
West Lancashire Football League
North West Counties Football League clubs